Cornland is an unincorporated community and census-designated place in Logan County, Illinois. As of the 2010 census, its population was 93.

History
Cornland was laid out and platted in 1871 when the Gilman, Clinton & Springfield Railroad was extended to that point. A post office called Cornland has been in operation since 1872.

Geography
The town of Cornland lies on the rolling flat land of the Sangamon River drainage area situated near the bottom grounds of Lake Fork Creek.

Demographics

References

External links
NACo

Census-designated places in Logan County, Illinois
Census-designated places in Illinois